Tsentralny District is an administrative district (raion) of Central Okrug, one of the 10 raions of Novosibirsk, Russia. The area of the district is 6.4 sq km (2.5 sq mi). Population: 78 794 (2017).

History
Tsentralny City District was established in 1940.

Streets

Architecture

Imperial Russia

Soviet architecture

Post-Soviet architecture

Economy

Industry
 Sinar Garment Factory, it was founded in 1921.
 Novosibirsk Cartographic Factory

Research institutes
 Institute of Systematics and Ecology of Animals
 N. A. Chinakal Institute of Mining
 NIIIP
 Research Institute of Electronic Devices
 Siberian Research Institute of Geology, Geophysics and Mineral Resources
 Siberian Research and Production Center of Geoinformation and Applied Geodesy

Transportation

Bus and trolleybus

Tram

Novosibirsk Metro
Four Novosibirsk Metro stations are located in the district: Ploshchad Lenina, Krasny Prospekt, Sibirskaya and Marshala Pokryshkina.

References